Sophie Irene Hunter (born 16 March 1978) is an English theatre director, playwright and former actress and singer. She made her directorial debut in 2007 co-directing the experimental play The Terrific Electric at the Barbican Pit after her theatre company Boileroom was granted the Samuel Beckett Theatre Trust Award. In addition, she has directed an Off-Off-Broadway revival of Henrik Ibsen's Ghosts (2010) at Access Theatre, the performance art titled Lucretia (2011) based on Benjamin Britten's opera The Rape of Lucretia at Location One's Abramovic Studio in New York City, and the Phantom Limb Company's 69° South also known as Shackleton Project (2011) which premièred at the Brooklyn Academy of Music's Harvey Theatre and later toured North America.

In August 2015, Hunter directed Phaedra and The Turn of the Screw to critical acclaim for the Happy Days Enniskillen International Beckett Festival and Aldeburgh Music, respectively.

Early life and education
Sophie Irene Hunter was born in Hammersmith district of London on 16 March 1978, she is the daughter of Anna Katharine (née Gow) and Charles Rupert. The couple later divorced. She has two younger brothers, Timothy and Patrick, as well as two half-siblings from her father's second marriage, Lily-Rose and Samuel. She is a niece of pianist Julius Drake. Her maternal grandfather is General Sir Michael James Gow, a British Army officer who worked with Prince Henry, Duke of Gloucester in the 1950s and was Aide-de-Camp General to the Queen from 1981 to 1984. Hunter's maternal great-great grandfather was First World War politician J. E. B. Seely, 1st Baron Mottistone.

Hunter attended St Paul's Girls' School in Hammersmith before studying Modern Languages with a concentration in French and Italian at the University of Oxford. After graduating from Oxford, Hunter lived in Paris to study avant-garde theatre for two years at the L'École Internationale de Théâtre Jacques Lecoq. She then trained at the Saratoga International Theatre Institute in New York City under theatre and opera director Anne Bogart.

Career

Theatre
Hunter co-founded the Lacuna Theatre Company and was an associate director at Royal Court Theatre in the West End of London and Broadhurst Theatre in New York's Broadway for the play Enron. She is the co-founder and artistic director of theatre company Boileroom, which won the 2007 Samuel Theatre Trust Award for the avant-garde play The Terrific Electric. She also serves as collaborating director and dramaturge on marionette and puppetry production with the Phantom Limb Company.

Known for her avant-garde plays, Hunter has directed, performed and conceived theatre productions throughout Europe, the Middle East and North America. She directed the experimental play 69° South (2013), the New York City performance art titled Lucretia (2011) based on Benjamin Britten's opera The Rape of Lucretia and the 2010 revival of Henrik Ibsen's Ghosts. She was a member of the performance collective Militia Canteen.

In collaboration with music director Andrew Staples, Hunter directed mezzo-soprano Ruby Philogene in Phaedra (2015) at the Happy Days Enniskillen International Beckett Festival in Northern Ireland. The production was met with praise, with The Guardian saying it was "exquisitely realized," The Stage hailing it as "creative brilliance," and The Times describing it as "astonishing". She has also staged Benjamin Britten's The Turn of the Screw in Suffolk and London for Aldeburgh Music.

In June 2017, Hunter took part as narrator in Music on the Meare at Aldeburgh Festival with readings from Ovid, John Dryden and Ted Hughes alongside oboist Nicholas Daniel.

Creative arts
Hunter worked on the transfer of Punchdrunk's Sleep No More to New York City in 2011 while serving as creative director for the theatre company Emursive. She has also directed the company's theatrical experiences The Forgotten (2012) and Don't Major in Debt Student House (2012). In 2013, she developed Loma Lights (2013), one of the largest public arts programs in New York City.

Music
In 2005, Hunter recorded a French-language music album titled The Isis Project in collaboration with songwriter Guy Chambers. In 2011, she released an English-language EP titled Songs for a Boy, again with Chambers. Hunter has also collaborated with Armin van Buuren for the song "Virtual Friend" which was included in Buuren's 2010 album Mirage.

Film and television
Earlier in her career, Hunter acted in film and television. She had supporting roles in the television series Midsomer Murders (2004), Keen Eddie (2004), Mumbai Calling (2007) and Torchwood (2009). In 2004, she played Maria Osborne in the costume drama film Vanity Fair starring Reese Witherspoon and played Annabel Blythe-Smith in the 2009 thriller film Burlesque Fairytales.

In May 2017, Hunter was announced as a producer for the film adaptation of Megan Hunter's dystopian novel The End We Start From alongside her husband Cumberbatch and Adam Ackland's production company Sunnymarch, and Liza Marshall's Hera Productions.

Recognition
Oxford Samuel Beckett Theatre Trust Award (2007)
International Artist Fellowship by Location One, New York City (2010/11)

Personal life

Hunter had a long-term relationship with sculptor Conrad Shawcross whom she met while studying at Oxford. The couple split in early 2010. On 14 February 2015, she married actor Benedict Cumberbatch at St Peter and St Paul's Church, Mottistone on the Isle of Wight followed by a reception at Mottistone Manor. They have three sons.

Hunter speaks fluent French and Italian. She is also a skilled pianist.

Selected credits

Theatre

As director

As actor

Film and television

As actor

Discography

References

External links

 
 

Living people
1978 births
Alumni of the University of Oxford
British theatre directors
British women dramatists and playwrights
British opera directors
Cumberbatch family
Female opera directors
L'École Internationale de Théâtre Jacques Lecoq alumni
People educated at St Paul's Girls' School
People from Hammersmith
Place of birth missing (living people)